The India women's national softball team is the national softball team of India in international-level softball competitions.

Tournament history

Women's Softball World Championship
 2016 Women's Softball World Championship - 29th

Asian Women's Softball Championship
 1991 Asian Women's Softball Championship - 12th
 1995 Asian Women's Softball Championship - participated
2004 Asian Women's Softball Championship - 12th
2011 Asian Women's Softball Championship - participated
 2017 Asian Women's Softball Championship - 9th
 2019 Asian Women's Softball Championship - 10th

References

National team
Women's national softball teams
Softball